Deon Kenzie (born 11 March 1996) is an Australian Para athlete who competes in the T38 (classification) prominently in the 1500m. He has won medals at the 2013, 2015 and 2017 World Para Athletics Championships including gold in the Men's 1500 m T38 in 2017. He won a silver medal in the Men's 1500 m T38  at the 2016 Rio Paralympics and a bronze medal at the 2020 Tokyo Paralympics.

Personal
Kenzie was born in Devonport, Tasmania. He has cerebral palsy, which affects the right side of his body. He has attended Forth Primary, Devonport High School and The Don College. He lives in Forth, Tasmania.

Athletics

In 2013, Kenzie made his international debut at the IPC Athletics World Championships in Lyon, France. Competing in the T38 1500m against the likes of Michael McKillop and Abbes Saidi, Kenzie led the first lap before eventually hanging on in the later stages for the bronze medal.

On 13 December 2014, he broke the Men's 1500m T38 world record at an athletics meeting in the Domain Athletic Centre in Hobart. His time of  4.08.51 beat Abbes Saidi of Tunisia world record of 4:09.50 that was set in July 2005. Kenzie is coached by Mike Gunson.

At the 2015 IPC Athletics World Championships in Doha, he won the bronze medal in the Men's 1500m T38 in a time of 4:11.60. In the Men's 800m T38, whilst sitting in the bronze medal position coming into the home straight, he fell and eventually finished in seventh place in 2:11.58.  After winning the bronze medal in the Men's 1500m, he said: "It's a great reward for all the hard work that I’ve put in this year and I can’t wait to get home to start working with Gunner (coach, Mike Gunson) and Philo (Saunders) on a program that will have me in the best possible shape when it counts even more in 2016."

Kenzie won a silver medal at the Men's 1500m T38 at the 2016 Rio Paralympics with a time of 4:14.95.

on 31 March 2017 in Sydney, he set a world record in the Men's 1500m T38 with a time of  4:05.11.

At the 2017 World Para Athletics Championships in London, England, he won the gold medal in the Men's 1500 m T38 ((4:06.68)) and silver medal in the Men's 800 m T38 (2:02.15 Australian record).

In his only event at the 2019 World Para Athletics Championships in  Dubai, Kenzie won the bronze medal in the Men's 1500 m T38.

At the 2020 Tokyo Summer Paralympics, he won the bronze medal in the Men's 1500 T38.

He is a Tasmanian Institute of Sport athletics scholarship holder.

Recognition
 2013 – The Advocate-IGA Junior Sports Awards.
 2014 – Athletics Tasmania U18 Athlete of the Year
 2014 – Finalist for the Athletics Australia Para Athlete of the Year award.

References

External links
 
 
 Deon Kenzie at Australian Athletics Historical Results

Paralympic athletes of Australia
Athletes (track and field) at the 2016 Summer Paralympics
Athletes (track and field) at the 2020 Summer Paralympics
Medalists at the 2016 Summer Paralympics
Medalists at the 2020 Summer Paralympics
Paralympic silver medalists for Australia
Paralympic bronze medalists for Australia
Cerebral Palsy category Paralympic competitors
Track and field athletes with cerebral palsy
World record holders in Paralympic athletics
People from Devonport, Tasmania
Living people
1996 births
Paralympic medalists in athletics (track and field)
Australian male middle-distance runners